The Piano Concerto Op. 1 in F-sharp minor is a concerto for piano and orchestra written by Norbert Burgmüller in the years 1828–1829. It premiered on 14 January in 1830 and was performed by Burgmüller himself at the piano.

Because of the early accidental death of Burgmüller at the age of 26 – he drowned in a spa in Aachen most likely due to an epileptic seizure – it is his only piano concerto.

Background 
The premiere was on 14 January 1830 in Kassel with Burgmüller at the piano. In 1833 Burgmüller became friends with Felix Mendelssohn, who performed the solo part in  Düsseldorf on 3 May 1834.

Composition 
The orchestra includes 2 flutes, 2 oboes, 2 clarinets, 2 bassoons, 2 horns, 2 trumpets, 3 trombones, kettledrums and strings. It is written in three-movement concerto form:

 Allegro ma non troppo
 Larghetto con moto
 Allegro moderato

Recordings 
 1998 – Leonard Hokanson on piano, conductor Gernot Schmalfuss – Concerto For Piano And Orchestra Op. 1 F Sharp Minor / Overture For Orchestra Op. 5 / Symphony No.2 Op. 11 D Major
 2000 – Nikolaus Lahusen on piano, conductor Heribert Beissel – Norbert Burgmüller: Klavierkonzert (op. 1) / Robert Schumann: Konzertstücke für Klavier und Orchester (op. 92 + 134).
 2012 – Tobias Koch on piano, conductor Frieder Bernius – Norbert Burgmüller: Klavierkonzert op. 1 / Entr'actes op. 17 / Ouverture op. 5

Sources 

1828 compositions
1829 compositions
Compositions in F-sharp minor
Piano concertos